Other language forms for the name John:

 Chon
 Dzon, Džon (Congolese, Serbian)
 Ean (Manx)
 Eóin (Irish)
 Evan (Welsh)
 Ganix (Basque)
 Giăng (Vietnamese, Protestant )
 Giannina (Italian)
 Gioan (Vietnamese, Catholic )
 Gioann (West-Lombard)
 Giovanni, Gianni (Italian)
 Giuàn (Emiliano-Romagnolo)
 Gion
 Gjon, Gjoni or Gjin (Albanian)
 Hannes (German from Johannes)
 Hannu (Finnish)
 Hans (Dutch, German, Swedish from Johannes)
 Henna
 Hoani (Māori) 
Hone (Māori) 
 Honza (Czech)
 Hovanes or Hovannes (Armenian)
 Ian (English)
 Iain (Scottish Gaelic—common form, though Ian is used in English)
 Ianto (Welsh)
 Ibane, Ibon (Basque)
 Ifan (Welsh)
 Ioan (Romanian, Welsh)
Ioane (Samoan)
 Ioannis (Greek)
 Ion (Romanian, Basque)
 Ionel (Romanian)
 Ieuan (Welsh)
 Ivan (Bulgarian, Croatian, Russian, Ukrainian and other Slavic language nations)
 Ivanko (Ukrainian)
 Ivo (Croatian and some other Slavic language nations)
 Jaan (Estonian)
 Jack (nickname for John; not traditionally a name in itself)
 Jan (Catalan, Czech, Dutch, Polish, Norwegian)
 Ján (Slovak)
 Jani (Finnish)
 Janez (Slovene)
 Jānis (Latvian)
 Janko (Slovak, Hungarian)
 Janek (Czech)
 Janne (Finnish)
 János (Hungarian) 
 Jăvan (Chuvash)
 Jean (French)
 Jens (Danish)
 Jhon (Colombian)
 Jhonas (Hebrew)
 Joan (Catalan)
 Joanes (Basque)
 Jóannes (Faroese)
 João (Portuguese)
 Johaiñe (Basque from Zuberoa/Soule province)
 Johan (Japanese, Dutch, Swedish, Danish, Norwegian, German, Faroese, Afrikaans)
 Johann (Germanic: German, Danish, Norwegian, Swedish)
 Jóhann (Icelandic, Faroese)
 Johannes (Germanic: German, Danish, Norwegian, Swedish, Dutch)
 Jóhannes (Icelandic)
 Jon   (Basque, Norwegian)
ジョン (Jon) (Japanese)
 Jón
 Jonas (Lithuanian, Germanic: German, Danish, Norwegian, Swedish, Dutch)
 Jovan (Serbian)
 Juan (Spanish, Filipino, Manx)
 Juhan (Estonian)
 Juhani (Finnish)
 Jöns (Swedish)
 Manex (Basque)
 Nelu (Romanian)
 Nzuá (Angolan)
 Ohan (Armenian) 
 Seán (Irish Seán, after the French Jean)
 Shane (Anglicised form of Seán)
 Shaun (American form of Sean)
 Shawn (Anglicised form of Seán)
 Sheik (Arabic)
 Siôn (Welsh)
 Sione (Tongan)
Soane (Tongan)
 ᏣᏂ (Cherokee) in Cherokee syllabary
 Xoán (Galician)
 Yahya (يوحنّا, Arabic, Turkish and Persian, for John the Baptist)
 Yan (Indonesian)
 Yanka (Belarusian)
 Yann (Breton)
 Yiannis (Greek)
 Vanya (Russian)
 Yochanan / Yohanan (יוֹחָנָן) (Hebrew)
 Yohannan (Malayalam)
 Yohannes (Ethiopian)
 Yohan, Yohanes (Indonesian, Malaysian)
 Yohan (Sinhalese, Sri Lankan)
 Yohanni (Makhuwa)
요한 (Korean)
 Yonnachan (Malayalam)
 Youhanna (يُوحَنّا) (Arabic and Persian, for John the Apostle)
 Youhannon (Malayalam)
 Yuhana (Mandaic)
  (Chinese in Traditional Chinese characters, Protestant translation)
 (Chinese in Traditional Chinese characters, Catholic Church translation)
強 (Chinese in Traditional Chinese characters, colloquial transliteration based on English; literally "strong")
 Zane

See also 
 
 Jane (given name) – other variants of the female form
 John (given name)
 Jonathan (name) – unrelated but similar name

References 

John